The 1968 Japan Series was the 19th edition of Nippon Professional Baseball's postseason championship series. It matched the Central League champion Yomiuri Giants against the Pacific League champion Hankyu Braves. This was a rematch of the previous year's Japan Series, which the Giants won. Yomiuri again defeated Hankyu in six games to capture their fourth consecutive title.

Summary

See also
1968 World Series

References

Japan Series
Orix Buffaloes
Yomiuri Giants
Japan Series
Japan Series
Japan Series